The Citadel Bulldogs wrestling team represents The Citadel of Charleston, South Carolina. The squad is led by head coach Ryan LeBlanc, and assistant coach Luke Welch. The Bulldogs are members of the Southern Conference and have won conference championships in 1967 and 2004.

As of 2014, the Bulldog wrestling team has made 14 NCAA championship team appearances. The Citadel's highest placement in school history was in 2013, when they finished 20th in the final NCAA Wrestling Team Championship standings. Vandiver Hall is the practice facility on campus for the wrestling team, while McAlister Field House hosts home dual meets and tournaments, also located on campus. The Citadel has also hosted outdoor matches three times, using the quadrangle within one of the open-air barracks.  The most recent such event was a loss to Arizona State on November 11, 2012.

Turtog Luvsandorj (2009–2014) is the career leader in wins at The Citadel with 134, a record he claimed on February 16, 2014 during back-to-back dual match wins over Duke and North Carolina in Charleston.

All-Americans
Four Bulldog wrestlers have placed in the top 8 of their weight class to earn All-America honors at the NCAA Division I Wrestling Championships.  Dan Thompson was the first to earn the honor, earning a 7th-place finish at 165 lb in 2006.  In 2013, Ugi Khishignyam finished 4th at 141 lb while teammate Odie Delaney finished 7th at heavyweight.  In 2014, five Bulldogs qualified for the NCAA Championships, with Turtog Luvsandorj earning All-American status with a 6th-place finish at 165 lbs.

Coaching staff
Ryan LeBlanc is the current head coach. LeBlanc competed collegiately at Indiana University. He is assisted by Luke Welch, who competed collegiately at Purdue University.

References

External links
 Bulldogs wrestling webpage